Jim Cashman may refer to:

 Jim Cashman (ice hockey), president of the Continental Junior Hockey League
 Jim Cashman (hurler) (born 1965), former Irish hurler
 Jim Cashman (actor), American actor and writer